Walkersville is an unincorporated community in Pierce County, in the U.S. state of Georgia.

History
Walkersville was founded in the 1880s by Jackson Walker, and named for him. A variant name is "Walkerville". A post office called Walkersville was established in 1898, and remained in operation until 1910.

References

Unincorporated communities in Georgia (U.S. state)
Unincorporated communities in Pierce County, Georgia